The following is an alphabetical list of articles related to the U.S. state of South Dakota.

0–9 

.sd.us – Internet second-level domain for the state of South Dakota
40th state to join the United States of America

A
Adjacent states:

Agriculture in South Dakota
Airports in South Dakota
Amusement parks in South Dakota
Arboreta in South Dakota
commons:Category:Arboreta in South Dakota
Archaeology in South Dakota
:Category:Archaeological sites in South Dakota
commons:Category:Archaeological sites in South Dakota
Architecture in South Dakota
Area codes in South Dakota
Art museums and galleries in South Dakota
commons:Category:Art museums and galleries in South Dakota
Astronomical observatories in South Dakota
commons:Category:Astronomical observatories in South Dakota

B
Badlands National Park
Black Hills
Botanical gardens in South Dakota
commons:Category:Botanical gardens in South Dakota
Buildings and structures in South Dakota
commons:Category:Buildings and structures in South Dakota

C

Capital of the State of South Dakota
Capitol of the State of South Dakota
commons:Category:South Dakota State Capitol
Casinos in South Dakota
Caves of South Dakota
commons:Category:Caves of South Dakota
Census statistical areas of South Dakota
Cities in South Dakota
commons:Category:Cities in South Dakota
Climate of South Dakota
Colleges and universities in South Dakota
commons:Category:Universities and colleges in South Dakota
Communications in South Dakota
commons:Category:Communications in South Dakota
Companies in South Dakota
Congressional districts of South Dakota
Corn Palace
Coteau des Prairies
Counties of the State of South Dakota
commons:Category:Counties in South Dakota
Culture of South Dakota
commons:Category:South Dakota culture

D
Demographics of South Dakota
:Category:Demographics of South Dakota
 Dignity (statue)

E
Economy of South Dakota
:Category:Economy of South Dakota
commons:Category:Economy of South Dakota
Education in South Dakota
:Category:Education in South Dakota
commons:Category:Education in South Dakota
Elections in the State of South Dakota
commons:Category:South Dakota elections
Environment of South Dakota
commons:Category:Environment of South Dakota

F

Festivals in South Dakota
commons:Category:Festivals in South Dakota
Flag of the State of South Dakota
Forts in South Dakota
:Category:Forts in South Dakota
commons:Category:Forts in South Dakota

G

Geography of South Dakota
:Category:Geography of South Dakota
commons:Category:Geography of South Dakota
Geology of South Dakota
commons:Category:Geology of South Dakota
Ghost towns in South Dakota
:Category:Ghost towns in South Dakota
commons:Category:Ghost towns in South Dakota
Government of the State of South Dakota  website
:Category:Government of South Dakota
commons:Category:Government of South Dakota
Governor of the State of South Dakota
List of governors of South Dakota
Great Seal of the State of South Dakota

H
Heritage railroads in South Dakota
commons:Category:Heritage railroads in South Dakota
High schools of South Dakota
Higher education in South Dakota
Highway routes in South Dakota
Hiking trails in South Dakota
commons:Category:Hiking trails in South Dakota
History of South Dakota
Historical outline of South Dakota
Hospitals in South Dakota
Hot springs of South Dakota
commons:Category:Hot springs of South Dakota
House of Representatives of the State of South Dakota

I
Images of South Dakota
commons:Category:South Dakota

J
James River
Jewel Cave (2nd Longest Cave in the World)

K

L
Lakes in South Dakota
:Category:Lakes of South Dakota
commons:Category:Lakes of South Dakota
Landmarks in South Dakota
commons:Category:Landmarks in South Dakota
Lieutenant Governor of the State of South Dakota
Lists related to the State of South Dakota:
List of airports in South Dakota
List of census statistical areas in South Dakota
List of cities in South Dakota
List of colleges and universities in South Dakota
List of counties in South Dakota
List of dams and reservoirs in South Dakota
List of forts in South Dakota
List of ghost towns in South Dakota
List of governors of South Dakota
List of high schools in South Dakota
List of highway routes in South Dakota
List of hospitals in South Dakota
List of individuals executed in South Dakota
List of lakes in South Dakota
List of law enforcement agencies in South Dakota
List of lieutenant governors of South Dakota
List of locations in South Dakota by per capita income
List of museums in South Dakota
List of National Historic Landmarks in South Dakota
List of newspapers in South Dakota
List of people from South Dakota
List of power stations in South Dakota
List of radio stations in South Dakota
List of railroads in South Dakota
List of Registered Historic Places in South Dakota
List of rivers of South Dakota
List of school districts in South Dakota
List of state parks in South Dakota
List of state prisons in South Dakota
List of symbols of the State of South Dakota
List of telephone area codes in South Dakota
List of television stations in South Dakota
List of United States congressional delegations from South Dakota
List of United States congressional districts in South Dakota
List of United States representatives from South Dakota
List of United States senators from South Dakota
Louisiana Purchase

M
Maps of South Dakota
commons:Category:Maps of South Dakota
Mass media in South Dakota
Missouri River
Monuments and memorials in South Dakota
commons:Category:Monuments and memorials in South Dakota
Mount Rushmore National Memorial
Mountains of South Dakota
commons:Category:Mountains of South Dakota
Mountain ranges of South Dakota
Museums in South Dakota
:Category:Museums in South Dakota
commons:Category:Museums in South Dakota
Music of South Dakota
commons:Category:Music of South Dakota
:Category:Musical groups from South Dakota
:Category:Musicians from South Dakota

N
National Forests of South Dakota
commons:Category:National Forests of South Dakota
Natural gas pipelines in South Dakota
Natural history of South Dakota
commons:Category:Natural history of South Dakota
Newspapers of South Dakota

O
Outdoor sculptures in South Dakota
commons:Category:Outdoor sculptures in South Dakota

P
People from South Dakota
:Category:People from South Dakota
commons:Category:People from South Dakota
:Category:People by city in South Dakota
:Category:People by county in South Dakota
:Category:People from South Dakota by occupation
Pierre, South Dakota, state capital since 1889
Politics of South Dakota
commons:Category:Politics of South Dakota
Portal:South Dakota
Protected areas of South Dakota
commons:Category:Protected areas of South Dakota

Q

R
Radio stations in South Dakota
Rapid City, South Dakota
Railroads in South Dakota
Registered historic places in South Dakota
commons:Category:Registered Historic Places in South Dakota
Religion in South Dakota
:Category:Religion in South Dakota
commons:Category:Religion in South Dakota
Renewable energy in South Dakota
Rivers of South Dakota
commons:Category:Rivers of South Dakota
Rock formations in South Dakota
commons:Category:Rock formations in South Dakota

S
School districts of South Dakota
Scouting in South Dakota
SD – United States Postal Service postal code for the State of South Dakota
Senate of the State of South Dakota
Settlements in South Dakota
Cities in South Dakota
Towns in South Dakota
Villages in South Dakota
Townships in South Dakota
Census Designated Places in South Dakota
Other unincorporated communities in South Dakota
List of ghost towns in South Dakota
Sioux Falls, South Dakota
Ski areas and resorts in South Dakota
commons:Category:Ski areas and resorts in South Dakota
Solar power in South Dakota
South Dakota  website
:Category:South Dakota
commons:Category:South Dakota
commons:Category:Maps of South Dakota
South Dakota Highway Patrol
South Dakota Open and Clean Government Act
South Dakota Small Investors Protection Act
South Dakota State Capitol
Sports in South Dakota
commons:Category:Sports in South Dakota
Sports venues in South Dakota
commons:Category:Sports venues in South Dakota
State of South Dakota  website
Government of the State of South Dakota
:Category:Government of South Dakota
commons:Category:Government of South Dakota
Executive branch of the government of the State of South Dakota
Governor of the State of South Dakota
Legislative branch of the government of the State of South Dakota
Legislature of the State of South Dakota
Senate of the State of South Dakota
House of Representatives of the State of South Dakota
Judicial branch of the government of the State of South Dakota
Supreme Court of the State of South Dakota
State parks of South Dakota
commons:Category:State parks of South Dakota
State police of South Dakota
State prisons of South Dakota
Structures in South Dakota
commons:Category:Buildings and structures in South Dakota
Supreme Court of the State of South Dakota
Symbols of the State of South Dakota
:Category:Symbols of South Dakota
commons:Category:Symbols of South Dakota

T
Telecommunications in South Dakota
commons:Category:Communications in South Dakota
Telephone area codes in South Dakota
Television stations in South Dakota
Territory of Dakota, 1861–1889
Territory of Iowa, 1838–1846
Territory of Louisiana, 1805–1812
Territory of Michigan, 1805-(1834–1836)-1837
Territory of Minnesota, 1849–1858
Territory of Missouri, 1812–1821
Territory of Nebraska, (1854–1861)-1867
Territory of Wisconsin, 1836-(1838)-1848
Tourism in South Dakota  website
commons:Category:Tourism in South Dakota
Transportation in South Dakota
:Category:Transportation in South Dakota
commons:Category:Transport in South Dakota

U
United States of America
States of the United States of America
United States census statistical areas of South Dakota
United States congressional delegations from South Dakota
United States congressional districts in South Dakota
United States Court of Appeals for the Eighth Circuit
United States District Court for the District of South Dakota
United States representatives from South Dakota
United States senators from South Dakota
Universities and colleges in South Dakota
commons:Category:Universities and colleges in South Dakota
US-SD – ISO 3166-2:US region code for the State of South Dakota

V

W
Wagnus massacre
Wall Drug Store
Wind Cave (4th Longest Cave in the World)
Wind power in South Dakota

X

Y
Yankton, Dakota Territory, territorial capital 1861–1883

Z

See also

Topic overview:
South Dakota
Outline of South Dakota

South Dakota
 
South Dakota